Mecklenburg County is the name of two counties in the United States:

 Mecklenburg County, North Carolina 
 Mecklenburg County, Virginia

See also
 Muhlenberg County, Kentucky